René Enjalbert (8 September 1890 - 29 December 1976) was a French politician.

Enjalbert was born in Aïn Témouchent. He represented the Independent Radicals in the Chamber of Deputies from 1936 to 1940. From 1951 to 1962 he belonged to the Senate.

References

1890 births
1976 deaths
People from Aïn Témouchent
People of French Algeria
Pieds-Noirs
Independent Radical politicians
Members of the 16th Chamber of Deputies of the French Third Republic
French Senators of the Fourth Republic
French Senators of the Fifth Republic
Senators of French Algeria
French military personnel of World War I